Charles Bingham may refer to:

Charles Bingham, 1st Earl of Lucan (1735–1799), Irish MP for Mayo, British MP for Northampton
Charles George Bingham, 4th Earl of Lucan (1830–1914), British MP for Mayo and Lord Lieutenant of Mayo 
Charles Thomas Bingham (1848–1908), Irish military officer and entomologist

See also
Charlie Bingham, Modern Family character